The 2014 World Cup was the 20th edition of the FIFA international association football tournament.

2014 World Cup may also refer to:

Association football
 2014 FIFA U-20 Women's World Cup
 2014 FIFA U-17 Women's World Cup
 2014 FIFA Club World Cup
 2014 ConIFA World Football Cup, for nations not affiliated to FIFA

Video games
 2014 FIFA World Cup Brazil (video game)

Other sports
 2014 Alpine Skiing World Cup
 2014 Archery World Cup
 2014 Canoe Slalom World Cup
 2014 Cricket World Cup Qualifier
 2013–14 UCI Track Cycling World Cup
 2014 FIBA Basketball World Cup
 2014 IAAF Continental Cup, in athletics
 2014 Men's Hockey World Cup
 2014 Women's Hockey World Cup
 2014 UCI Women's Road World Cup, in cycling
 2014 Women's Rugby World Cup, in rugby union